A mystic society is a Mardi Gras social organization in Mobile, Alabama, that presents parades and/or balls for the enjoyment of its members, guests, and the public. The New Orleans Krewe is patterned after Mobile's Mystics.  The societies have been based in class, economic and racial groups.  Mobile's parading mystic societies build colorful Carnival floats and create costumes around each year's themes.

During the Carnival season, the mystic societies parade in costume on their floats throughout downtown Mobile. Masked society members toss small gifts, known as throws, to the parade spectators.  The throws can take the form of trinkets, candy, cookies, peanuts, panties, artificial roses, stuffed animals, doubloons, cups, hats, can coolers, Frisbees, medallion necklaces, bead necklaces of every variety, and Moon Pies.

Mystic societies in Mobile give formal masquerade balls, known as bal masqués, which are almost always invitation only and are oriented to adults.  Attendance at a ball requires that a strict dress code be followed that usually involves full-length evening gowns and white tie with tails for invited guests, and masked costumes for society members.  The bal masqués feature dramatic entertainment, music, dancing, food, and drinks. Bal masqués  are normally based on a theme which is carried out through scenery, decorations, and costumes.  Some society balls also include a tableau vivant. Much of the memorabilia from  these occasions can be viewed at the Mobile Carnival Museum.

History

Mobile first celebrated Carnival in 1703 when French settlers began the festivities at the Old Mobile Site.  Mobile's first informal Carnival society was organized in 1711 with the Boeuf Gras Society (Fatted Ox Society).

Mobile's Cowbellion de Rakin Society was the first formally organized and masked mystic society in the United States to celebrate with a parade in 1830.  The Cowbellions got their start when a cotton factor from Pennsylvania, Michael Krafft began a parade with rakes, hoes, and cowbells.  The Cowbellions introduced horse-drawn floats to the parades in 1840 with a parade entitled, "Heathen Gods and Goddesses.  The Striker's Independent Society was formed in 1842 and is the oldest surviving mystic society in the United States.  The idea of mystic societies was exported to New Orleans in 1856 when six businessmen, three who were formerly of Mobile, gathered at a club room in New Orlean's French Quarter to organize a secret society, inspired by the Cowbellion de Rakin Society, that would observe Mardi Gras with a formal parade.  They founded New Orleans' first and oldest krewe, the Mistick Krewe of Comus.  Carnival celebrations in Mobile were cancelled during the American Civil War.

Mardi Gras parades were revived in Mobile after the Civil War by Joe Cain in 1867, when he paraded through the city streets on Fat Tuesday while costumed as a fictional Chickasaw chief named Slacabamorinico.  He irreverently celebrated the day in front of occupation Union Army troops.  The Order of Myths, Mobile's oldest mystic society which continues to parade, was founded in 1867 and held its first parade on Mardi Gras night in 1868.  The Infant Mystics also begin to parade on Mardi Gras night in 1868,  but later moved its parade to Lundi Gras (Fat Monday).

The Mobile Carnival Association (MCA) was formed in 1871 to coordinate the events of Mardi Gras; this year also saw the first Royal Court held with the first king of Carnival, Emperor Felix I.  The Comic Cowboys of Wragg Swamp were established in 1884, along with their mission of satire and free expression.  The Continental Mystic Crew mystic society was founded in 1890, it was Mobile's first Jewish mystic society.  The Order of Doves mystic society was founded in 1894 and held its first Mardi Gras ball. It was the first organized African-American mystic society in Mobile.  The first mystic of women was the M.W.M who held its first and likely only ball in 1890 and the first women's society to parade in the streets of Mobile was the Order of Polka Dots who rolled in 1950 just one night before its friendly rivals, the Maids of Mirth (MOMs).

The Infant Mystics, the second oldest society that continues to parade, introduced the first electric floats to Mobile in 1929. The Colored Carnival Association was founded and had its first parade of societies in 1939; it was later named the Mobile Area Mardi Gras Association (MAMGA).  The MAMGA installed the first African-American Mardi Gras court in 1940 with the coronation of King Elexis I and his queen.  It coordinates events of African-American mystic societies.

Founded in 1961, Le Krewe De Bienville (LKDB) exists as Mobile's only civic and charitable organization with a mission statement to promote Mobile and its Mardi Gras.  Following the lead of the little-known Krewe of Pan and Apostles of Apollo, societies comprising members of the city's gay and lesbian community, the Order of Osiris held its first ball in 1980. It is now one of the Carnival season's most anticipated balls and sought-after invitation.

The Mobile International Carnival Ball was first held in 1995, with every known Mobile mystic society in attendance.  The Order of Outowners mystic society was founded in 2001 with the mission of being a more modern and inclusive society than the traditional ones, and offers ball tickets for sale to the general public.  The Conde Explorers were founded as a parading mystic society in 2004, with the express mission of being open to all races and both genders.  The Conde Explorers were one of several mystic societies featured in the 2008 documentary film, The Order of Myths. It reveals Mobile's Carnival preparations and celebrations, the beauties and joys, as well as the complex racial history of the city and its mystic societies.

Past and present societies
Some of the mystic societies in Mobile (not all):

Apostles of Apollo
Ancient Society of Mystics
Belles and Beaux
Blue Birds
Boeuf Gras Society
Cain's Merry Widows
Cain's Twelfth Night Society
Chickasaw War Party
Comic Cowboys
Comrades Club
Conde Cavaliers
Conde Explorers
Continental Mystic Crew
Court of Isabella
Cowbellion de Rakin Society
Crewe of Columbus
Dominoes
Don Donas
Emeralds
Etruscans
Fifty Funny Fellows
Follies
Followers of Apolla
Forty-Niners
Harlequins
Imperial Fun Makers
Independent Fun Lovers
Infant Mystics
Joe Cain Marching Society
Jokers Wild
Kickshaw Society
Knights of Daze
Knights of Ebony
Knights of Folly
Knights of Glory
Knights of Joy
Knights of May Zulu Club
Knights of Mobile
Knights of Pegasus
Knights of Revelry
Krewe of Admiral Semmes
Krewe of Columbus
Krewe of Don Q
Krewe of Elks 
Krewe of Marry Mates
Krewe of Mohomet
Krewe of Phoenix
Krewe of Venus
La Luna Servante
Le Krewe de Bienville
Les Bons Vivants
Les Femmes Cassettes
Maids of Mirth
Marquis de Lafayette Societie
Mardi Gras Pilgrims
Masters of the Old World
Merry Evening Maskers
MiKrafft Association (MKA)
Midnight Maskers
Midnight Merry Makers
Midnight Mystics
Mistresses of Joe Cain
Mobile Married Mystics
Mobile Mystics
Mobile Rifles
Monday Evening Maskers
Monday Mystics
Mystic Krewe of Myrthe
Mystic Krewsaders
Mystic Maskers
Mystic Stripers Society
Mobile's Mystical Ladies
Mystics
Mystics of Time
Mystical Belles
Neptune's Daughters
Nereides
New Mobilians
Order of Angels
Order of Athena
Order of Butterfly Maidens
Order of Dead Rock Stars
Order of Doves
Order of Dragons
Order of Druids
Order of Imps
Order of Inca
Order of Isis
Order of Jesters
Order of Juno
Order of LaShe's
Order of Mardi Gras Maskers
Order of Myths
Order of Orioles
Order of Osiris
Order of Outowners
Order of Pan
Order of Polka Dots
Order of Shiners
Order of Venus
Original Dragons
Original Social Utopia Club
Pharaohs
Phifty Phunny Phellows
Pierrettes
Resurrected Cowbellion de Rakin Society
S.C.S. a.k.a. Santa Claus Society
Sauvettes Social Club
Sirens
Sons and Daughters of Joe Cain
Sons of Cyreniac
Sons of Saturn
Spinsters
Strikers Club
Striker's Independent Society
Strikers Social Club
Tea Drinker's Society
Thalians
The Tillmans Tricksters
The Tombstone Kids
Utopia Club

References

Further reading
Mobile, Alabama
Mardi Gras
Mardi Gras in Mobile

Mardi Gras
Carnival and Mardi Gras in Mobile, Alabama
Cultural institutions in Mobile, Alabama
History of Mobile, Alabama
Carnivals